Embassy of Indonesia, Ottawa is the diplomatic mission of the Republic of Indonesia to Canada. The embassy also represents Indonesia in the International Civil Aviation Organization (ICAO). In addition to the embassy, Indonesia has two consulate generals in Toronto (Ontario) and Vancouver (British Columbia).

The chancery is located on Parkdale Avenue, south of the Ottawa River in Mechanicsville. The Indonesian government bought and renovated the building in this location in 1997. Before this location, the chancery was located on 287 MacLaren Street, Ottawa. When the diplomatic mission was still in the form of a legation office in 1952, it was located on Aylmer Road, Aylmer, Quebec.

The first Indonesian ambassador to Canada was Ali Sastroamidjojo (1953–1954). The current ambassador is Daniel Tumpal Sumurung Simanjuntak.

See also 

 Indonesia–Canada relations
 List of diplomatic missions of Indonesia

References

External links 

 
 
 

Canada–Indonesia relations
Ottawa
Indonesia